The Pac-12 Conference Men's Basketball Player of the Year is a basketball award given to the Pac-12 Conference's most outstanding player. The award was first given following the 1975–76 season, when the conference was known as the Pacific-8, and is determined by voting from the Pac-12 media and coaches. There have been two players honored multiple times: David Greenwood of UCLA and Sean Elliott of Arizona. Four freshmen have also won the award: Shareef Abdur-Rahim of California, Kevin Love of UCLA, Deandre Ayton of Arizona and Evan Mobley of USC.

The only current Pac-12 member without a winner is one of the two newest members, Colorado.  Between the arrival of Arizona and Arizona State in 1978 and the entry of Colorado and Utah in 2011, the conference was known as the Pacific–10.

Key

Winners

Winners by school

Footnotes
 For purposes of this table, the "year joined" reflects the year that each team joined the conference now known as the Pac-12 as currently chartered. Although the Pac-12 claims the Pacific Coast Conference (PCC), founded in 1915, as part of its own history, that conference disbanded in 1959 due to infighting and scandal. That same year, five PCC members established the Athletic Association of Western Universities (AAWU) under a new charter that functions to this day. The Player of the Year Award was not established until 1976, by which time all of the final members of the PCC except for Idaho were reunited in what was then the Pac-8.

See also 
List of All-Pac-12 Conference men's basketball teams

References
General
  
Specific

NCAA Division I men's basketball conference players of the year
Player of the Year
Awards established in 1976